The Kanishka casket or Kanishka reliquary, is a Buddhist reliquary made in gilded copper, and dated to the first year of the reign of the Kushan emperor Kanishka, in 127 CE.  It is now in the Peshawar Museum in the historic city of Peshawar, Pakistan.

History and description
It was discovered in a deposit chamber under the monumental Kanishka stupa (described by Chinese pilgrims in the 7th century as the tallest stupa in all India), during the archeological excavations in 1908-1909 in Shah-ji-Dheri on the outskirts of Peshawar. It is said to have contained three bone fragments of the Buddha, which were forwarded to Burma by the British following the excavation, where they still remain.

The casket is today at the Peshawar Museum, and a copy is in the British Museum. The casket is dedicated in Kharoshthi. The inscription reads:

Originally it was believed, that the text is signed by the maker, a Greek artist named Agesilas, who oversaw work at Kanishka's stupas (caitya), confirming the direct involvement of Greeks with Buddhist realizations at such a late date: "The servant (dasa) Agisalaos, the superintendent of works at the vihara of Kanishka in the monastery of Mahasena" ("dasa agisala nava-karmi ana*kaniskasa vihara mahasenasa sangharame"). However, a recent cleaning of the casket had shown that the old reading was not accurate. Instead, the name is to be read agnisala, which is the refectory of the monastery.

The lid of the casket shows the Buddha on lotus pedestal, and worshipped by Indra and Brahma.

The edge of the lid is decorated by a frieze of flying geese, or hamsa, symbolizing the travel of departing souls and the removal from samsara. Some of the geese have a wreath of victory in their beak.

The body of the casket represents a Kushan monarch, probably Kanishka in person, with the Iranian Sun god and Moon god at his side. On the sides are two images of a seated Buddha, worshiped a royal figures, possibly a bodhisattava.

A garland, supported by cherubs goes around the scene in typical Hellenistic style.

The relics themselves were forwarded to Burma by the British in 1910 in order to safeguard them. They are today visible in Mandalay. The three fragments of bone are believed to be true relics of Gautama Buddha.

Gallery

See also
 Cetiya
 Bimaran reliquary
 Rukhuna reliquary
 Silver Reliquary of Indravarman
 Bajaur casket
 Kushan art

Notes

References
Baums, Stefan. 2012. “Catalog and Revised Texts and Translations of Gandharan Reliquary Inscriptions.” In: David Jongeward, Elizabeth Errington, Richard Salomon and Stefan Baums, Gandharan Buddhist Reliquaries, p. 246, Seattle: Early Buddhist Manuscripts Project (Gandharan Studies, Volume 1).
Baums, Stefan, and Andrew Glass. 2002– . Catalog of Gāndhārī Texts, no. CKI 145
 Fenet, Annick (2020): « "In other words, authentic relics of the Buddha himself !" La fouille du stūpa de Kanishka à Shāh-jī-kī-Dherī (février-mars 1909) », in S. Alaura (ed.), Digging in the archives. From the history of oriental studies to the history of ideas, Roma (Documenta Asiana XI), 2020, p. 63-90

External links

Photograph of the Kanishka casket

Indian Buddhist sculpture
Asian objects in the British Museum
Kushan Empire
Peshawar
Buddhist reliquaries